"Sure and Certain" is the lead single from Jimmy Eat World's ninth studio album Integrity Blues. It was released on August 30, 2016. The single's B-side, "My Enemy", is a protest anthem against Donald Trump that was notably recorded for Dave Eggers' 30 Days, 30 Songs project.

Track list

Chart performance
"Sure and Certain" debuted at number 31 on the Billboard Alternative Songs chart. It peaked at number 10, making it the band's highest charting single since "My Best Theory" reached number two on the chart in 2010.

References

External links 
 

Jimmy Eat World songs
2016 songs
2016 singles
RCA Records singles